K-Ville (an abbreviation of Katrinaville) is an American crime drama television series that aired from September 17 to December 17, 2007, on Fox, created by executive producer Jonathan Lisco, centering on policing New Orleans after Hurricane Katrina. Deran Sarafian directed the pilot.

On May 15, 2008, the series was canceled.

Production notes
The pilot episode was written by Lisco (who also served as executive producer), directed by Deran Sarafian, and stars Anthony Anderson as Marlin Boulet and Cole Hauser as Trevor Cobb, partners who "have conflicting ideas about how to handle the city's problems." The pilot also features John Carroll Lynch, Tawny Cypress and Blake Shields.

The first episode featured a 1970 Pontiac Catalina as the getaway car early in the show.

The show had permission to use the official New Orleans Police Department logos, particularly the unique "star and crescent" badge design, and was filmed on location in the city in March and April 2007. According to the NOPD's public integrity bureau, the production emphasizes the "good work that the men and the women of the Police Department performed [after Katrina], which was not portrayed by much of the media."

Lisco, a former lawyer who has previously written scripts for The District and NYPD Blue, did several ride-alongs with the New Orleans Police Department before writing a script for the pilot. It was during one such ride-along that he spotted some graffiti sporting the shorthand for "Katrinaville" that became the show's title.

In order to promote the series, Fox made the pilot episode available for streaming on a number of television media websites on August 22, 2007.

Due to the Writers Guild of America strike, K-Ville shut down production and only 11 of the 13 episodes were produced. The show did not appear on Fox's midseason schedule.

Cast and characters
Anthony Anderson as Marlin Boulet
Cole Hauser as Trevor Cobb
Tawny Cypress as Ginger "Love Tap" LeBeau
Blake Shields as Jeff Gooden
John Carroll Lynch as Capt. James Embry
Maximiliano Hernandez as Billy Faust

Broadcast history
Produced by 20th Century Fox Television, the series was officially greenlit and given a thirteen-episode order on May 11, 2007. It premiered on September 17, 2007, on Fox,  and was also broadcast by Fox8 and Channel Ten in Australia, E! in Canada and Five USA in the UK.

Episodes

U.S. Nielsen weekly ratings

References

External links
 Official Site
 

2000s American crime drama television series
2007 American television series debuts
2007 American television series endings
American action television series
Fox Broadcasting Company original programming
Serial drama television series
Television series about Hurricane Katrina
Television series by 20th Century Fox Television
Television shows set in New Orleans
Fictional portrayals of the New Orleans Police Department